The  was a class of minesweepers of the Imperial Japanese Navy (IJN), serving during  World War II. 70 vessels were planned under the Maru 4 Programme (Ship # 164–169), Maru Kyū Programme (Ship # 410–437) and Kai-Maru 5 Programme (Ship # 5301–5336), however, only 17 vessels were completed.

Background
 Project number I4B. Improved model of the No.7-class. The IJN gave them a turret of 55 degrees gun elevation, because the IJN wanted to attack the strong point of behind the hill to them. And it was not useful in the Pacific War very much.
 And after the Maru Kyū Programme vessels abolished double-curvature bow for a mass production and changed bow shape.

Ships in class

Photo

Footnotes

Bibliography

, History of Pacific War Vol.51 The truth histories of the Japanese Naval Vessels Part-2, Gakken (Japan), August 2005, 
Ships of the World special issue Vol.45, Escort Vessels of the Imperial Japanese Navy, (Japan), February 1996
The Maru Special, Japanese Naval Vessels No.50, Japanese minesweepers and landing ships,  (Japan), April 1981
50 year History of Harima Zōsen, Harima Zōsen Corporation, November 1960

World War II mine warfare vessels of Japan
Minesweepers of Japan
Mine warfare vessels of the Imperial Japanese Navy
Gunboats of the Imperial Japanese Navy
Mine warfare vessel classes